Howorth is a surname of English Anglo-Saxon origin, most commonly found among families originating in the English counties of Yorkshire and Lancashire, especially around the village of Great Howarth near Rochdale, Lancashire, and Haworth in Yorkshire. It is found in a variety of different interrelated spellings, including Haworth, Howarth, Hearwarthe, and Huarth and derives from one of two meanings, hoh-worth, meaning settlement on a small hill, and haga-worth, settlement surrounded by a hawthorn hedge. The first recorded use of the surname in its current spelling is from 1616; earlier varieties are found as far back as Robert de Hawrth in 1200.

People
Charles Howorth (1856–1945), New Zealand artist
Dick Howorth (1909–1980), English cricket player
Henry Howorth (disambiguation), several people
Jolyon Howorth (born 1945), British scholar of European politics
Kenneth Howorth (1932–1981), British police officer killed by an IRA bomb
Lucy Somerville Howorth (1895–1997), American lawyer, feminist and politician
Tony Howorth (born 1938), English retired cricketer

See also
Haworth
Howarth

References

English-language surnames
English toponymic surnames